Ponni is a 1953 Indian Tamil-language film starring Sriram, Lalitha and Padmini. The film was released in 1953, and the Telugu version Oka Talli Pillalu in the same year.

Plot
The story is about a less privileged woman (P. Santha Kumari) left with two daughters. She loses one girl ("Baby" Chandrakumari, later Padmini), who is found by a wealthy man (D. Balasubramaniam). He changes her name to Kanmani and brings her up in luxury. She becomes proud. The struggling mother sends the other girl Ponni ("Baby" Asha, later Lalitha) to work in Kanmani's house. Kanmani ill treats her and once pushes her down the staircase, which injures Ponni badly, and she lands in hospital. The rich man has an adopted son Sundaram (Kaushik). His brother, a ne'er-do-well (Sriram), misbehaves with both Ponni and Kanmani. In the process, Ponni tries to save her sister, and lands in prison, accused of murder. However, the truth comes out and they all live happily thereafter.

Cast
Cast adapted from the film titles (see external links)

Male Cast
 Sriram as Samarasam
 T. S. Durairaj as Murugan
 D. Balasubramaniam as Nallasivam Pillai
 M. L. N. Kaushik as Sundaram
 M. R. Swaminathan as Munusami
 V. M. Ezhumalai as Chokkan
 Narayana Pillai as Expert Detective
 K. S. Kannaiah as Muniyan
 T. P. Ponnusami Pillai as Tamil Pundit Ponnarangam
 Ponnaiah as Vaiyapuri
International Wrestling 
 King Kong as Hungarian World Champion
 Dara Singh as India's ace wrestler 
 Alireza Bey as Champion of Turkey (Referee)

Female Cast
 Lalitha as Ponni
 Padmini as Kanmani
 P. Santha Kumari as Sornam 
 P. S. Gnanam as  Maragatham
 K. N. Kamalam as Santhanalakshhmi
 Pachanayaki as Valli
 Baby Asha as Young Ponni
 C. R. Chandrakumari as Young Kanmani
Dance 
 Ragini 
 Ambika
 Sukumari

Production
A. S. A. Sami was directing the film, but for an unknown reason he left half-way. C. Srinivasa Rao, (son of filmmaker C. Pullaiah) took over.A dance drama with the popular story of Lord Krishna which was titled Bhama Vijayam was performed by Ragini and her cousins Ambika and Sukumari. Choreography was handled by Hiralal.

Ponni was based on Sami's screen story, with dialogue by Sami, star Tamil screenwriter Elangovan and Balasubramaniam. For some reason, Sami opted out of the project midway, and C. S. Rao (C. Srinivasa Rao) completed it. The film was shot at Pakshiraja Studios in Coimbatore. An additional attraction in the film was the real-life wrestling sequence between King Kong (Hungarian World Champion) and Dara Singh along with referee Alireza Bey (Champion of Turkey). Such fights were a major attraction in Madras those days and they were performed in Park Town near Central Station.

A dance drama, Bhama Vijayam, the popular story of Lord Krishna, Sathyabhama and Rukmini was added to the film. It featured Ragini and her cousins Ambika and Sukumari, with dances composed by noted choreographer B. Hiralal.

A real life wrestling contest between Dara Singh and King Kong was an added attraction.

Soundtrack
The music was composed by Subbiah Naidu. Lyrics were by Narayanakavi, Ramaiah Dass, Balasubramaniam & Makkalanban. Playback singers are C. S. Jayaraman, Loganathan, Mariappa, Perianayaki, Jayalakshmi, Komala and Radha.

References

External links
 

1953 films
1950s Tamil-language films
Films scored by S. M. Subbaiah Naidu